Gadadhara Pandita, also known as Pandita Goswami, was a close associate of Chaitanya Mahaprabhu. Gadadhara Pandita Goswami is described as a handsome young boy, student of Nyaya (Indian logic) and ranked highest among the inner circle of Chaitanya Mahaprabhu's followers.

In the later part of his life, Gadadhara Pandita lived in the Tota Gopinatha Temple. The local legend around the temple is that the deity of Krishna in the temple sat down to accommodate Pandit Goswami's worship after he had become feeble due to Chaitanya Mahaprabhu's departure. Others say that Chaitanya Mahaprabhu and Pandit Goswami disappeared on the same day inside the Gundicha Temple of Puri, Odisha.

The Gadadhara Parivara 
Chaitanya Mahaprabhu personally gave Gadadhara Pandita Goswami the deity to worship, and the responsibility to teach Srimad Bhagavatam. Pandita Goswami's guru was Pundarika Vidyanidhi. Pandita Goswami initiated Bhugarbha Goswami, and Bhugarbha Goswami gave rise to one line of the Gadadhara parivara. The Gadadhara Parivāra (Parivāra means 'family') is one among different traditional Chaitanya lineages that have continued till modern times; the Advaita Parivāra is another example.

Because Pandita Goswami is the combined power, the followers of Pandita Goswami aspire for mādhurya-rasa. The custom of the Gadadhara parivara is to worship the deities of Gaura and Gadadhara.

Followers of the Gadadhara parivara are of the opinion that Rupa and Sanatana Goswami, Narottama Dasa Thakura Mahasaya and his guru Lokanath Goswami were disciples of Gadadhara Pandita. Others hold that Sanatana Goswami was the disciple of Madhusudana Vidyavacaspati, the brother of the famous logician Sarvabhauma Bhattacarya, and Rupa Goswami was the disciple of Sanatana Goswami. Again there are others, that are saying that Sanatana Gosvami was the disciple of Chaitanya Mahaprabhu.

See also
Haridas Shastri
Satyanarayana Dasa
Hare Krishna

References

16th-century Hindu religious leaders
Spiritual teachers
Year of birth missing
Year of death missing
Gaudiya religious leaders
Bengali Hindus
Scholars from West Bengal
Vaishnava saints